Ecma International is a nonprofit standards organization for information and communication systems. It acquired its current name in 1994, when the European Computer Manufacturers Association (ECMA) changed its name to reflect the organization's global reach and activities. As a consequence, the name is no longer considered an acronym and no longer uses full capitalization.

The organization was founded in 1961 to standardize computer systems in Europe. Membership is open to large and small companies worldwide that produce, market, or develop computer or communication systems, and have interest and experience in the areas addressed by the group's technical bodies. It is located in Geneva.

Aims 
Ecma aims to develop standards and technical reports to facilitate and standardize the use of information communication technology and consumer electronics; encourage the correct use of standards by influencing the environment in which they are applied; and publish these standards and reports in electronic and printed form. Ecma publications, including standards, can be freely copied by all interested parties without copyright restrictions. The development of standards and technical reports is done in co-operation with the appropriate national, European, and international organizations.

Unlike national standardization bodies, Ecma is a membership-based organization. It takes pride in the resulting "business-like" approach to standards, claimed to lead to better standards in less time, thanks to a less bureaucratic process focused on achieving results by consensus.

Ecma has actively contributed to worldwide standardization in information technology and telecommunications.

The memberlist of Ecma International is available on its website. Its members include IT companies, IT trade associations, universities, foundations and public institutions.

Standards

Ecma International is responsible for several standards, including:
 ECMA-6 – 7-bit Coded Character Set (based on ASCII), also approved as ISO/IEC 646
 ECMA-35 – Character Code Structure and Extension Techniques, also approved as ISO/IEC 2022
 ECMA-48 – Control Functions for Coded Character Sets, also approved as ISO/IEC 6429
 ECMA-107 – FAT12/FAT16 file system
 ECMA-119 – CD-ROM volume and filestructure (later known as ISO 9660)
 ECMA-130 – CD-ROM "Yellow Book" format
 ECMA-262 – ECMAScript Language Specification (based on JavaScript)
 ECMA-334 – C# Language Specification
 ECMA-335 – Common Language Infrastructure (CLI)
 ECMA-341 – Environmental design considerations for electronic products
 ECMA-363 – Universal 3D File Format
 ECMA-367 – Eiffel: Analysis, design and programming Language (See Eiffel programming language)
 ECMA-372 – C++/CLI Language Specification
 ECMA-376 – Office Open XML (later known as ISO/IEC 29500)
 ECMA-377 – Holographic Versatile Disc (HVD) Recordable Cartridges
 ECMA-378 – Read-Only Memory Holographic Versatile Disc (HVD-ROM)
 ECMA-388 – Open XML Paper Specification
 ECMA-402 – ECMAScript Internationalization API Specification
 ECMA-404 – JSON
 ECMA-408 – Dart language specification

Java programming language
Although Sun Microsystems submitted its Java programming language to Ecma, Sun subsequently withdrew the submission. Thus, Ecma is not responsible for the standardization of Java.

Office Open XML formats
Ecma is involved in the standardization of the Office Open XML format based on the XML office document formats by Microsoft. The Ecma Office Open XML maintenance process is performed by technical committee 45 (TC45).

Technical Committees 
The Ecma standards are governed through Technical Committees assigned to particular areas or topics, such as:

 TC39 – responsible for ECMAScript.
 TC45 – responsible for Office Open XML.
 TC53 – responsible for ECMAScript Modules for Embedded Systems.

Eco Declaration

In Ecma International Standard 370, Ecma joined with the Scandinavian IT Eco Declaration organisation to put forward a guideline for informing consumers about the environmental practices of the manufacturers of ICT and consumer electronics products.

The IT Eco Declaration includes information on the environmental practices of the manufacturer as well as product features, such as environmentally conscious design, batteries, acoustic noise, electrical safety, energy consumption, chemical emissions, substances and materials included, and packaging. This makes it easy to compare different suppliers and their products, as they all present the environmental features of their products in the same way, through a common industry standard reporting form.

See also
 List of Ecma standards
 European Committee for Standardization
 International Electrotechnical Commission (IEC)
 International Organization for Standardization (ISO)

References

External links

 
 Index of Ecma Standards
 C# Language Specification

Information technology organizations based in Europe
Organisations based in Geneva
Organizations established in 1961
Standards organisations in Switzerland